Code 8 is a 2019 Canadian science fiction action film written and directed by Jeff Chan, about a man with superpowers who works with a group of criminals to raise money to help his sick mother. It is a feature-length version of the 2016 short film of the same name. A sequel, Code 8: Part II, is set to be released.

Plot 

In the early 20th century, the public becomes aware of people with superhuman abilities, known as Powers, resulting in the government passing a law requiring all Powers to register their abilities. Although they are initially popular in the workforce, as the Third Industrial Revolution begins, Powers are marginalized in the face of increasing mechanization, leading to severe prejudice. By the 1990s, a crime syndicate known as The Trust has flooded the streets with an addictive drug called Psyke, made from the spinal fluid of trafficked Powers. Police departments begin using drone-deployed robots, called Guardians, and facial recognition software to combat Power-related crime while a citywide Powers ban is debated.

Connor Reed, a 26-year-old Class 5 Electric (electrokinetic) looks after his mother Mary, a Cryo (cryokinetic), who has brain cancer that causes her abilities to sometimes act erratically. As Powers, they cannot afford the treatment she needs. Connor makes ends meet by working as an unregistered day laborer alongside other Powers, but he risks danger of being caught by police. 

Elsewhere in the city, a drug raid is conducted by detectives Park and Davis on an apartment complex owned by crime lord Marcus Sutcliffe, the local agent of The Trust and a Reader (mind reader). Almost $1 million worth of product is seized, putting Marcus in conflict with Wesley Cumbo, his Trust superior who demands their expected cut in a week's time. Connor is approached by Garrett, Marcus's underling and a TK (telekinetic), and his crew for a job. Connor goes with them and participates in a robbery, shorting out the electric fence. Connor is introduced to Marcus and meets Nia, Marcus's apparent girlfriend. Park and Davis arrive on the scene the next day and determine that Marcus is desperate for revenue.

Garrett recruits Connor, recognizing he has untapped potential, and agrees to help him earn enough money to get Mary's treatment. He trains Connor to use his abilities and uses him as an enforcer in the Psyke trade. Connor also grows close with the members of Garrett's crew, including Freddie, a mute Brawn (super strength), and Maddy, Garrett's girlfriend, a Pyro (pyrokinesis). Marcus has the crew rob a bank to pay back The Trust, but the vault contains only a tenth of the money they expected. Wesley's Shifter (shapeshifter) assassin, Copperhead, attempts to kill Marcus for not honoring his debt, but Marcus's bodyguard Rhino, a Brawn with bulletproof skin, kills her. Nia reveals to Connor that she is a Healer, and only remains with Marcus to ease the effects of his Psyke addiction and pay off her imprisoned father's debt.

Mary confronts Connor about the stash of money he has been making working with the crew, but suddenly convulses. Connor rushes her to hospital, where the doctor tells him they will need to operate soon to remove her tumor. Park and Davis bring Connor in for questioning, encouraging him to cooperate as they have already confiscated much of the Psyke on the street. Davis advises they plant evidence in order to coerce Connor into informing, while Park is adamant that they cut him loose due to lack of evidence. Connor is released and goes to Garrett to suggest they raid the scheduled Psyke Run, the monthly transport of seized product for destruction, which will be worth approximately $10 million. Garrett and Connor bring the idea to Marcus, where Connor demands Nia heal Mary as payment and Garrett stipulates he will become a partner in running the Psyke trade.
 
On the day of the heist, the crew blocks the truck while it is inside a no-fly zone, preventing back-up by drones carrying Guardians. Although they manage to retrieve the Psyke, Marcus's men execute the officers protecting the truck and betray them, killing Maddy and mortally wounding Freddie before he, Garrett and Connor manage to escape. Rhino flees with the drugs while the drone pilot disregards the no-fly zone and drops additional Guardians into the area, killing the rest of Sutcliffe's men. Freddie dies as Connor and Garrett drive away. Connor tells Garrett that Marcus framed them because of Garrett's demands, and they part ways. Park visits his daughter, a TK, who is afraid she will be given away because she is struggling to control her abilities. Connor contacts Park and offers up Marcus's hideout. The cops raid Marcus's hideout while Connor and Garrett fight and kill both Rhino and Marcus. Garrett takes the Psyke and encourages Connor to get Nia. Nia pleads with Connor to let her go, as her abilities force her to take the injury or disease onto herself. Connor takes Nia to the hospital at gunpoint, but tells her to stop after thinking of his mother. Connor shares a tearful goodbye with Mary before she dies.

Connor gives Nia his truck in order to leave the city, while Garrett hands over the Psyke to Wesley and takes over the drug trade for The Trust in Lincoln City. Connor visits his mother's grave before he goes on the run, while Nia has a tearful visit with her father. Meanwhile, the Powers Ban is being voted on while Park reluctantly accepts an award for the raid against Marcus.

Cast

Production 
In 2016, Robbie and Stephen Amell released a short film, Code 8, which acted as a teaser for a potential feature film. An Indiegogo fundraising campaign asking for $200,000 was launched on March 23 and reached $2.4 million by April 24. Fundraising closed with $3.4 million on December 31, 2019, with the continued campaign helping recover costs of DVD pressings and the distribution to contributors of perks, wardrobe and props from the production. A four-minute segment of the film's closing credits shows a list of only some of the 30,810 contributors to the fundraising campaign.

The first announcement of additional cast came on June 12, 2017, when Laysla De Oliveira joined the film.

Principal photography began on June 1, 2017 in Toronto.

Distribution 
On February 9, 2017, during the Berlin International Film Festival, XYZ Films acquired the international sales rights for the film. The film was released theatrically on December 13, 2019.  The film was released on Netflix in the United States on April 11, 2020.

Reception 
On Rotten Tomatoes, the film received an approval rating of 81%, based on 21 reviews, with an average rating of 6.2/10. On Metacritic, the film received a score of 48 out of 100, based on 5 critic reviews, indicating "mixed or average reviews".

Dennis Harvey of Variety found the crowdfunded Code 8 a "solid genre effort" that "is resourceful and polished on a tight budget". He noted a few limitations, for example a screenplay that "packs in a lot of characters and complications without much time to lend them distinguishing personality", not enough humor to transcend the "sentimental cliché" of a mother needing medical treatment, and a "lack of stylistically bold elements in the competent action sequences". He nevertheless thought the film a "well-crafted mix of crime melodrama and fantasy" with "generally strong" performances from its actors, and visual effects that "present a plausible near-future", and that this feature represents an "impressive leap in scale" from Chan's 2014 debut film.  Noel Murray of Los Angeles Times considered that while the movie has "clearly been made with passion and intelligence", the "ideas outpace the action" and it was made "without the kind of zip that this kind of story demands".

In April 2020, the film appeared on the Top 10 Netflix list for the United States.

Future

Spin-off series 
In December 2019, a short-form spin-off series starring Robbie and Stephen Amell, written by Chris Pare, and directed by Jeff Chan was announced in development at Quibi. Following the announcement that Quibi is shutting down, the series has been left in limbo.

Sequel 
In June 2021, Robbie and Stephen Amell were attached to reprise their roles in a sequel titled Code 8: Part II. Netflix acquired the global rights to the film.

References

External links 
 
 
 
 
 Code 8 at Library and Archives Canada

2019 films
2019 science fiction action films
Canadian science fiction action films
English-language Canadian films
Features based on short films
2010s superhero films
Biopunk films
2010s dystopian films
Films shot in Toronto
2010s English-language films
Canadian superhero films
2010s Canadian films